
In Greek mythology, the name Periboea (Ancient Greek: Περίβοια "surrounded by cattle" derived from peri "around" and boes "cattle") refers to multiple figures:

Periboea, one of the 3,000 Oceanids, water-nymph daughters of the Titans Oceanus and his sister-wife Tethys. She was the mother of Aura by Lelantos.
Periboea, daughter of the Giant Eurymedon and the mother of Nausithous with Poseidon.
Periboea, daughter of either King Cychreus of Salamis or of King Alcathous of Megara, her mother in the latter case being either Pyrgo or Evaechme, daughter of King Megareus of Onchestus. She was ravished by Telamon who then fled away; when her father learned of that, he ordered for her to be cast in the sea, but the guard who was to perform that took pity on her and sold her away; the one who bought her happened to be Telamon. She became by him mother of Ajax. She was among the would-be sacrificial victims of Minotaur; while on board the ship, Minos attempted to sexually abuse her but she was defended by Theseus, with whom she later consorted. Also known as Eriboea.
Periboea, wife of King Polybus of Corinth and mother of Alcinoe. She was the foster mother of Oedipus, future king of Thebes.
Periboea, a Naiad, wife of Icarius, mother of Penelope, Perilaus, Aletes, Damasippus, Imeusimus and Thoas, presumably also of Iphthime. Icarius' wife is alternatively known as Asterodia, Dorodoche or Polycaste
Periboea, the Olenian daughter of Hipponous and mother of Tydeus and possibly Melanippus or Olenias by Oeneus. She was sent by his father to Oeneus because she was seduced by Hippostratus, son of Amarynceus.
Periboea, one of the first two maidens sent by the people of Locris to the shrine of Athena at Troy, in order to relieve them of plague. The other was named Cleopatra.
Periboea, eldest daughter of Acessamenus, and mother of Pelagon by the river-god Axius.
Periboea, mother, by Meges, of the Trojans Celtus and Eubius (Εὔβιος).
Periboea, daughter of Aeolus, the wind lord, and Telepora or Telepatra.

See also 
  for Jovian asteroid 12929 Periboea

Notes

References 
 Athenaeus of Naucratis, The Deipnosophists or Banquet of the Learned. London. Henry G. Bohn, York Street, Covent Garden. 1854. Online version at the Perseus Digital Library.
 Athenaeus of Naucratis, Deipnosophistae. Kaibel. In Aedibus B.G. Teubneri. Lipsiae. 1887. Greek text available at the Perseus Digital Library.
 Fowler, R. L. (2000), Early Greek Mythography: Volume 1: Text and Introduction, Oxford University Press, 2000. .
 Gaius Julius Hyginus, Fabulae from The Myths of Hyginus translated and edited by Mary Grant. University of Kansas Publications in Humanistic Studies. Online version at the Topos Text Project.
 Homer, The Odyssey with an English Translation by A.T. Murray, PH.D. in two volumes. Cambridge, MA., Harvard University Press; London, William Heinemann, Ltd. 1919. Online version at the Perseus Digital Library. Greek text available from the same website.
 Lucius Mestrius Plutarchus, Lives with an English Translation by Bernadotte Perrin. Cambridge, MA. Harvard University Press. London. William Heinemann Ltd. 1914. 1. Online version at the Perseus Digital Library. Greek text available from the same website.
 Lucius Mestrius Plutarchus, Moralia with an English Translation by Frank Cole Babbitt. Cambridge, MA. Harvard University Press. London. William Heinemann Ltd. 1936. Online version at the Perseus Digital Library. Greek text available from the same website.
 Nonnus of Panopolis, Dionysiaca translated by William Henry Denham Rouse (1863-1950), from the Loeb Classical Library, Cambridge, MA, Harvard University Press, 1940.  Online version at the Topos Text Project.
 Nonnus of Panopolis, Dionysiaca. 3 Vols. W.H.D. Rouse. Cambridge, MA., Harvard University Press; London, William Heinemann, Ltd. 1940-1942. Greek text available at the Perseus Digital Library.
 Parthenius, Love Romances translated by Sir Stephen Gaselee (1882-1943), S. Loeb Classical Library Volume 69. Cambridge, MA. Harvard University Press. 1916.  Online version at the Topos Text Project.
 Parthenius, Erotici Scriptores Graeci, Vol. 1. Rudolf Hercher. in aedibus B. G. Teubneri. Leipzig. 1858. Greek text available at the Perseus Digital Library.
 Pausanias, Description of Greece with an English Translation by W.H.S. Jones, Litt.D., and H.A. Ormerod, M.A., in 4 Volumes. Cambridge, MA, Harvard University Press; London, William Heinemann Ltd. 1918. Online version at the Perseus Digital Library
 Pausanias, Graeciae Descriptio. 3 vols. Leipzig, Teubner. 1903.  Greek text available at the Perseus Digital Library.
 Pindar, Odes translated by Diane Arnson Svarlien. 1990. Online version at the Perseus Digital Library.
 Pindar, The Odes of Pindar including the Principal Fragments with an Introduction and an English Translation by Sir John Sandys, Litt.D., FBA. Cambridge, MA., Harvard University Press; London, William Heinemann Ltd. 1937. Greek text available at the Perseus Digital Library.
 Quintus Smyrnaeus, The Fall of Troy translated by Way. A. S. Loeb Classical Library Volume 19. London: William Heinemann, 1913. Online version at theio.com
 Quintus Smyrnaeus, The Fall of Troy. Arthur S. Way. London: William Heinemann; New York: G.P. Putnam's Sons. 1913. Greek text available at the Perseus Digital Library.
 Sophocles, The Ajax of Sophocles edited with introduction and notes by Sir Richard Jebb. Cambridge. Cambridge University Press. 1893. Online version at the Perseus Digital Library.
 Sophocles, Sophocles. Vol 2: Ajax. Electra. Trachiniae. Philoctetes with an English translation by F. Storr. The Loeb classical library, 21. Francis Storr. London; New York. William Heinemann Ltd.; The Macmillan Company. 1913. Greek text available at the Perseus Digital Library.
 Strabo, The Geography of Strabo. Edition by H.L. Jones. Cambridge, Mass.: Harvard University Press; London: William Heinemann, Ltd. 1924. Online version at the Perseus Digital Library.
 Strabo, Geographica edited by A. Meineke. Leipzig: Teubner. 1877. Greek text available at the Perseus Digital Library.
Tzetzes, John, Allegories of the Iliad translated by Goldwyn, Adam J. and Kokkini, Dimitra. Dumbarton Oaks Medieval Library, Harvard University Press, 2015.

External links
Lyons, Deborah. Gender and Immortality - Appendix: A Catalogue of Heroines

Oceanids
Naiads
Mortal parents of demigods in classical mythology
Princesses in Greek mythology
Aetolian characters in Greek mythology
Laconian characters in Greek mythology
Megarian characters in Greek mythology
Salaminian mythology